1987 Emperor's Cup Final was the 67th final of the Emperor's Cup competition. The final was played at National Stadium in Tokyo on January 1, 1988. Yomiuri won the championship.

Overview
Defending champion Yomiuri won their 3rd title, by defeating Mazda 2–0. Yomiuri was featured a squad consisting of Yasutaro Matsuki, Hisashi Kato, Satoshi Tsunami, Ruy Ramos and Tetsuya Totsuka.

Match details

See also
1987 Emperor's Cup

References

Emperor's Cup
1987 in Japanese football
Tokyo Verdy matches
Sanfrecce Hiroshima matches